Mears Group plc is a housing and social care provider.  It repairs and maintains over 700,000 social homes across the UK.

History
The company was founded in 1988 in Gloucestershire, where it is still based, and floated on the Alternative Investment Market of the London Stock Exchange, as Mears Group plc in 1996. In 1999 it acquired Haydon & Co and in 2007 Careforce. In 2008, the group had 8000 employees, and moved to the main market at the London Stock Exchange, with a £420m turnover.

In 2011 it took over more than 20 Home Improvement Services from Anchor, and in 2012 acquired Morrison Facilities Services from AWG plc. In 2012 it acquired Independent Living Services Scotland and launched Mears Nurseplus, enabling the company to offer health services as well as social care. Nurseplus (specialising in the care of adult and paediatric service users with complex health conditions, both acute and chronic that require clinical intervention and management) was awarded a place on the NHS framework contract to supply staff into NHS establishments across Scotland in November 2014.

In October 2014 it took over Omega Group Ltd., a private sector provider of residential lettings and management services to the social housing market. In December 2014 Torbay and Southern Devon Health and Care NHS Trust named the Group as the preferred bidder to run its Living Well@Home Services contract, integrating IT systems and deliver a range of community-based services for a minimum of five years.

In June 2015 it bought Care UK's home care division, with about 6,000 employees for £11.3 million. Subsequently renamed Mears Care, it looked after about 13,000 people.

In December 2016, executive director Alan Long announced that the company was pulling out of contracts with local authorities because it could not afford to operate on the money it was being paid.

In January 2019, it was announced that Mears Group would take over a Home Office contract to provide housing for asylum seekers in Glasgow from Serco. At the start of the COVID-19 pandemic Mears moved 350 asylum seekers from living in their own private apartments to living in six hotels across the city, reducing their independence and reducing their ability to social distance, often being moved with little or no prior notice. At the same time the UK Government Home Office suspended the £5.37 per day support payment that they had been receiving, leaving asylum seekers fully dependent on the services provided by Mears, and in some cases unable to communicate with friends, family, solicitors or any external support. Charities like Refuweegee and Scottish Refugee Council drew attention to the conditions that people were being held in calling on the UK Government and their contractor Mears to restore the support payments and move people back into private accommodation. On 5 May 2020, Adnan Walid Elbi a Syrian refugee was found dead in his room at the Mclays Guest House in Glasgow. Elbi's father had been murdered by ISIS in 2018, his youngest brother was kidnapped by ISIS in 2019, and Elbi himself had been detained and tortured by Ansar al-Sharia. Elbi had repeatedly told authorities about previous suicide attempts and ongoing suicidal ideation including the week before his death. In June 2020, Badreddin Abadlla Adam, a Sudanese asylum seeker being cared for by Mears in a hotel in Glasgow city centre stabbed three fellow asylum seekers, two hotel staff and a responding police officer with a knife. Adam was shot dead by armed police officers but the six stabbing victims survived. A report by the Home Affairs Select Committee in July 2020 advised that asylum seekers "should not have been moved to new accommodation during the pandemic without justified and urgent reasons for doing so, or without a vulnerability assessment demonstrating that the move could be made safely." In August 2020, Mercy Baguma was discovered dead in her Govan flat beside her one year old child. Baguma had been working in a restaurant to support herself, but after her leave to remain had expired she wasn't allowed to work, meaning she was dependent on others for support including the asylum system.

In January 2020 it announced that it was to sell its domiciliary care division which employed 1,500 people across 18 branches in England and Wales and 1,000 people across 16 branches in Scotland. It planned to concentrate on providing housing with care. The division was sold to Cera Care in February 2020.

Cornwall Council confirmed the group as lead strategic partner for the delivery of extra care in Cornwall with a seven year agreement for 750 extra care housing units worth £150 million.

Performance
Profits in the first six months of 2014/5 were £18.7m, an increase of 11%. Total group revenue was down 3% from £439.1m to £428.1m.

In a half-year trading update in July 2020, Mears said it expected to report a £6m loss after a 23% drop in revenue at its maintenance arm. Overall group revenue was down 8% to £405m. The company also announced it would be making an unspecified number of redundancies, partly due to the impact of the COVID-19 pandemic in the United Kingdom.

Political involvement
Mears was nominated as a Social Mobility Business Compact ‘Champion’ after signing the Social Mobility Business Compact, set up by the Deputy Prime Minister Nick Clegg in 2011, to encourage employers to offer young people fair and open access to employment opportunities.

The group, with the Local Government Information Unit, supported a report, in December 2014 by former care minister Paul Burstow calling for home care workers to be given key workers status and a living wage.

References

External links
Mears Group

1988 establishments in England
Companies based in Gloucestershire
Health care companies established in 1988
Companies formerly listed on the Alternative Investment Market
Companies listed on the London Stock Exchange
Private providers of NHS services
Social care in the United Kingdom